Los Caimanes is a Peruvian football club, playing in the city of Puerto Etén, Chiclayo, Lambayeque.

History
The club was founded on the May 22, 1957 under the name of Club Cultural y Deportivo Los Caimanes de Puerto Etén in the city of Puerto Etén, Chiclayo, Lambayeque.

In the 2011 Copa Perú, the club classified to the National Stage, but was eliminated by Pacífico in the semi-finals. In 2012 they played in the 2012 Peruvian Segunda Division where they finished third. In 2013 they won the 2013 Peruvian Segunda División and were promoted to the 2014 Torneo Descentralizado. On their debut year in the first division the club was relegated to the Peruvian Segunda Division after finishing 15th on the aggregated table and losing a relegation play-off against Sport Huancayo.

Honours

National
Peruvian Segunda División:
Winners (1): 2013
Runner-up (1): 2015

Regional
Región I:
Winners (1): 2011

Liga Departamental de Lambayeque:
Winners (2): 1960, 2011

Liga Superior de Lambayeque:
Winners (1): 2011

Liga Provincial de Chiclayo:
Runner-up (1): 2010

Liga Distrital de Eten:
Winners (1): 2010

Current squad
2019

See also
List of football clubs in Peru
Peruvian football league system

External links
 Historia de Los Caimanes

Football clubs in Peru
Association football clubs established in 1957